The  of guided-missile destroyers in the Japan Maritime Self-Defense Force are equipped with the Aegis Combat System, and is the first of few ship classes outside the United States to have that capability. Following a decision made in December 2003, Japan is upgrading their Kongo-class destroyers with Aegis Ballistic Missile Defense System. The upgrade involves a series of installations and flight tests to take place from 2007 to 2010. JS Kongo was the first ship to have the BMD upgrade installed.

Background 
The JMSDF built  under FY1960 program and started shipboard operation of surface-to-air missiles. She had been equipped with analog-version of the Tartar Guided Missile Fire Control System. A fully-digitized system was adopted on the next-generation , and later a combat direction system based on the Naval Tactical Data System was added.

Nevertheless, the JMSDF estimated that its fleets would not survive against Soviet airstrikes, especially Tupolev Tu-22M bombers and AS-4 air-to-surface missiles. Based on these estimates, JMSDF began to pursue the introduction of the Aegis Weapon System (AWS) from the early 1980s. In 1984, with the prospect of deploying AWS, concrete implementation plans began. And the construction of Japanese first Aegis-equipped ships, Kongo class, had begun under the FY1988 program.

Design 
The overall design is generally modeled on the s of the U.S. Navy. The hull adopted shelter deck design as with preceding Japanese destroyers, but it was widened to support the superstructure with four PESA antennas just as Arleigh Burke class. Due to this widened hull, the outer panel is inclined to reduce the width of the waterline, which also has the effect of reducing radar cross section area.

Because they are built to different operational requirements than the Arleigh Burke-class destroyers, such as for carrying extra commanding equipment, the Kongō-class ships' internal arrangement is quite different from the original design on which they are based. Recognisable external features are the vertical mast and enlarged superstructure to carry sufficient headquarters equipment so that they could act as a flagship.

Equipment 
The class is equipped with the Aegis Weapon System (AWS). The system version was Baseline 4 for name-ship through the third ship, and Baseline 5 for fourth ships immediately after they were put into service; then all ships were updated to Baseline 5.3 with modernization. The class uses the AN/SPY-1D as the main radar. As surface-to-air missiles, the SM-2MR Block IIIA was initially used, and later the Block IIIB came into use. Since the mid-2000s, they have also been equipped with a missile defense capability with the primary intention of countering North Korean ballistic missiles, and now have an Aegis BMD 3.6 system installed to launch SM-3 Block IA and IB missiles. 

The Mark 41 Vertical Launching System arrangement, similar to the Arleigh Burke class, consisted of 29 cells on the foredeck and 61 cells on the afterdeck. These cells contain not only RIM-162, SM-2, and SM-3, but also VL-ASROCs. In addition, they are equipped with HOS-302, one of the Japanese variant of the Mark 32 Surface Vessel Torpedo Tubes, as anti-submarine weapons and Harpoon as anti-ship missiles. And as gunnery weapons, an Oto Melara /54 caliber gun and two Mark 15 20 mm CIWS gun mounts are installed.

Most of electronic devices outside of AWS originated in Japan. For electronic warfare, this class is equipped with NOLQ-2, an elaborate system capable of both ES and EA. The OQS-102 sonar is equivalent to the U.S. SQS-53C.

Flight tests for Aegis BMD systems 
In December 2007, Japan conducted a successful test of the SM-3 block IA against a ballistic missile aboard . This was the first time a Japanese ship was selected to launch the interceptor missile during a test of the Aegis Ballistic Missile Defense System. In previous tests, they provided tracking and communications. Afterward, Japan has also undertaken another two successful Ballistic Missile Defense tests aboard  in October 2009 and aboard  in October 2010. While one test aboard  in November 2008 failed to intercept the target.

Names 
The Kongō-class destroyers are named after mountains in Japan, and all four also share their names with World War II-era Japanese warships.

Ships in the class

See also
 Aegis Combat System
 List of naval ship classes in service
 List of active Japan Maritime Self-Defense Force ships

References

Bibliography

External links

 GlobalSecurity.org; JMSDF DDG Kongo Class
 Japan Maritime Self-Defense Forces page on Andrew Toppan's Haze Gray and Underway web site

 
Destroyer classes
Kongo class